The 1932–33 season was Arsenal's 14th consecutive season in the top division of English football. For the second time in three years they won the league title, clinching it at Chelsea with a 3–1 win. They finished four points clear of Aston Villa but went out of the FA Cup at lower-league Walsall. Over the course of the season, Arsenal inflicted a number of heavy defeats, including 6-1 versus Sunderland, 8–2 against Leicester City, 7–1 at Wolverhampton Wanderers, 9–2 against Sheffield United at Highbury, and 8–0 against Blackburn Rovers. The Gunners also beat title rivals Villa 5–0 at Highbury in April, though lost 5–3 away in November. 
Arsenal's top scorer was Cliff Bastin, who netted 33 goals-all off them in the league.

Results
Arsenal's score comes first

Legend

Football League First Division

Final League table

FA Cup

See also

 1932–33 in English football
 List of Arsenal F.C. seasons

References

English football clubs 1932–33 season
1932-33
1932-33